Internet Movie Cars Database, often abbreviated as IMCDb, is an online database of auto, motorcycle and other motor vehicle appearances in films. The website was created in 2004 with a name similar to Internet Movie Database.

History
The project was founded in 2004 by a French web developer, quickly helped by Belgian programmer Antoine Potten, who took over the project completely in 2005, to compile information about vehicles used in films. The website initially focused on only automobiles used in movies and TV series, but eventually started to include other kinds of vehicles such as motorcycles, tanks, and heavy machinery. As of July 2021, more than 60,000 movies and TV series were analyzed and more than 800,000 vehicles were identified, including those used in alternate endings and cut scenes. As of July 2021, there were 5,274 brands of vehicles listed on the website, as well as more than 52,000 vehicles waiting for a proper identification.

See also
 Internet Movie Firearms Database — website of similar concept for firearms

References

External links

Internet Game Cars Database (official website)
Internet Movie Plane Database (official website)

Automotive websites
Film websites
Online film databases